André Veilleux is a Canadian former professional ice hockey player. He was the first overall pick in the 1965 NHL Amateur Draft, picked by the New York Rangers, but he never played professional hockey.

Career statistics

External links 
 

Canadian ice hockey right wingers
Living people
National Hockey League first-overall draft picks
National Hockey League first-round draft picks
New York Rangers draft picks
Year of birth missing (living people)